Rupnagar railway station is a railway station in Rupnagar district, Punjab. Its code is RPAR. It is fall under Northern Railway zone's Ambala railway division. It serves Rupnagar city. The station consists of 1 platform.

Major trains 
Some of the important trains that run from Anandpur Sahib are:

 Himachal Express
 Amritsar–Nangal Dam Express
 Una Jan Shatabdi Express
 Haridwar–Una Link Janshatabdi Express (via Chandigarh)
 Hazur Sahib Nanded–Una Himachal Express
 Gurumukhi Superfast Express

References

Railway stations in Rupnagar district
Ambala railway division